Acsád is a village in Vas County, Hungary.

Notable people
Nándor Fettich (1900–1971), archaeologist and goldsmith.
Béla Rákosi (1841–?), doctor
Jenő Rákosi (1842–1929), writer and journalist.

Populated places in Vas County